Adele (Adelheit Johanne Auguste Hermine) aus der Ohe (11 February 18618 December 1937) was a German concert pianist and composer. Her compositions, including the Suite No. 2 in E major, Op. 8, were published by G. Schirmer Inc.

Life
Adele aus der Ohe was born in Hanover. She initially studied with Theodor Kullak, where American pianist and chronicler Amy Fay heard her playing. Calling her "a little fairy of a scholar, ten years old," Fay wrote: "I heard her play a concerto of Beethoven the other day with orchestral accompaniment and a great cadenza by Moscheles, absolutely perfectly. She never missed a note all the way through."

Aus der Ohe was one of the few child prodigies accepted as a pupil by Franz Liszt; she began studying with him at the age of 12 and stayed with him for seven years (1877–1884), making her American debut playing his First Piano Concerto in the Steinway Hall in New York on 23 December 1886. She promoted Liszt's music throughout her career; having Richard Watson Gilder written a poem about such interpretations.

Aus der Ohe was a friend of Pyotr Ilyich Tchaikovsky as well, whose First Piano Concerto she performed under the composer's baton at the inaugural concert of Carnegie Hall in New York, as well as at his final concert in St. Petersburg, where the Pathétique Symphony was premiered. She subsequently settled in the United States, touring there for seventeen consecutive seasons. She returned to Germany in 1906 and died in Berlin in 1937.

Compositional style
Adele aus der Ohe was highly endowed and had a distinctive degree of temperament as a pianist. As already mentioned by magazines and music journals of her time, she was successful not only as such, but also as a composer, as appropriately described in a concert review from Hamburg in January 1910, where she was also honoured by the work she had performed.

Between 1895 and 1906, her name appeared regularly in the renowned publishers catalogue of G. Schirmer (New York) and Ries & Erler (Berlin). Among her compositions are numerous songs, some with words by Richard Watson Gilder (1844–1909), several piano works, and duets for violin and piano. And although further prints after 1906 are not available, a note in the Neue Zeitschrift für Musik suggests that after her retreat from the American musical life, she continued her composing work.

Repertoire
Aus der Ohe's repertory was large and included both Brahms concertos, the second of which she played as early as 1899 in Boston. She specialized in large-scale works; a typical program she played in Boston consisted of Beethoven's Waldstein Sonata, Chopin's Funeral March Sonata, Schumann's Fantasie in C and Liszt's Réminiscences de Don Juan.

Works for piano

Notes

References

Further reading
 Schonberg, Harold C., The Great Pianists (New York: Simon & Schuster, 1987, 1963). .

External links
 Musik under Gender im Internet 
 A Critical Study, Polish Music Journal

German classical pianists
German women pianists
1861 births
1937 deaths
19th-century classical pianists
20th-century classical pianists
19th-century classical composers
20th-century classical composers
Women classical pianists
German women classical composers
Musicians from Hanover
19th-century German composers
20th-century German composers
Women classical composers
20th-century women composers
19th-century women composers
20th-century German women musicians
19th-century women pianists
20th-century women pianists